Synochoneura sapana is a moth of the family Tortricidae. It is found in Vietnam.

The wingspan is 19 mm. The ground colour of the forewings is yellowish mixed with brownish costally and in the apical area where it is dotted brownish. The postmedian area is pale pinkish brown tinged cream at the termen. The hindwings are brownish grey, but yellowish cream at the apex.

References

Moths described in 2008
Archipini
Taxa named by Józef Razowski
Moths of Asia